This is a list of the municipalities in the province of Cuenca, in the autonomous community of Castile–La Mancha, Spain. There are 238 municipalities in the province.

See also
Geography of Spain
List of cities in Spain

Cuenca